Royal Air Force Mullaghmore or more simply RAF Mullaghmore is a former Royal Air Force station located  southwest of Ballymoney, County Antrim, Northern Ireland and  northeast of Garvagh, County Londonderry.

History

It was a United States Army Air Forces 8th Air Force Composite Command base until being passed to the Royal Air Force in May 1944 for use as a training establishment.

Between December 1943 and February 1944 the airfield was used the United States Army Air Forces (USAAF)'s 6th Replacement and Training Squadron (Bombardment) and the 6th Combat Crew Replacement Centre before the unit moved to RAF Cheddington. The airfield was then used for storage until May 1944.

The following units were based there:
 No. 4 Refresher Flying Unit RAF which moved from RAF Haverfordwest and stayed between October 1945 and March 1945
 No. 7 (Coastal) OTU flying Vickers Wellingtons between December 1942 and January 1944
 No. 104 (Transport) OTU arrived from RAF Maghaberry flying Vickers Wellingtons between October 1943 and January 1944
 No. 281 Squadron RAF
 815 Naval Air Squadron
 825 Naval Air Squadron
 842 Naval Air Squadron
 850 Naval Air Squadron
 1771 Naval Air Squadron
 Loran Training Unit RAF (October 1944 – April 1945)

The airfield was closed and placed on care and maintenance during May 1945.

Current use

The airfield, now in private hands, is used as a microlight base. It has been known locally as Aghadowey Aerodrome.

See also
List of former Royal Air Force stations

References

Citations

Bibliography

External links
Page at controltowers.co.uk
Airfields in County Londonderry

Royal Air Force stations in Northern Ireland
Buildings and structures in County Antrim
Military history of County Antrim
Mull
Mull